The Republic of Korea Army (ROKA), also known as the ROK Army or South Korean Army, is the army of South Korea, responsible for ground-based warfare. It is the largest of the military branches of the Republic of Korea Armed Forces with 365,000 members . This size is maintained through conscription; All able-bodied South Korean males must complete military service (18 months for the army, auxiliary police, and marines, 20 months for the navy and conscripted firefighters, 21 months for the air force and social service, and 36 months for alternative service) between the ages of 18 and 35.

History

The Republic of Korea Army traces its lineage back to the Gwangmu Reform, when the Pyŏlgigun was established by Emperor Gojong in 1881.

The 1st of every October is celebrated in South Korea as Armed Forces Day. It commemorates the day during the Korean War when units of the ROK Army first crossed the 38th Parallel, thus leading the UN coalition into North Korean territory for the first time.

The National Security Guard of South Korea was originally formed out of the ROK Army. This organization was created during the United States-led occupation period from 1945 to 1948. The National Security Guard was initially a reserve unit of the National Police. In addition, some Nationalist Chinese and former soldiers of the Manchukuo Imperial Army also contributed to the force. The National Defense Force was established on January 15, 1946, replacing the United States lead constabulary from 1945.

The outbreak of the Korean War caught the ROK forces unprepared, requiring the United Nations to intervene with US-led forces. The South Korean military rapidly developed during the Korean War, suffering enormous casualties and loss of equipment. As the Soviets had armed North Korea, the United States armed and trained the South Korean military throughout the Korean War.

Current operational status
The Republic of Korea Army is structured to operate in both the mountainous terrain native to the Korean Peninsula (70% mountainous) and in North Korea with its 950,000 strong Korean People's Army Ground Force, two-thirds of which is permanently garrisoned in the frontline near the DMZ. The current administration has initiated a program over the next two decades to design a purely domestic means of self-defense, whereby South Korea would be able to fully counter a North Korean attack.

The ROK Army was formerly organized into 3 armies: the First Army (FROKA), the Third Army (TROKA), and the Second Operational Command, each with its own headquarters, corps, and divisions. The Third Army was responsible for the defense of the capital as well as the western section of the DMZ. The First Army was responsible for the defense of the eastern section of the DMZ whereas the Second Operational Command formed the rearguard.

Under a restructuring plan aimed at reducing redundancy, the Second ROK Army was converted into the Second Operations Command in 2007, and the First and Third ROK Armies were merged as the Ground Operations Command in 2019.

Equipment

The army consists of 365,000 troops, approximately 2,200 tanks, 3,100 armored fighting vehicles, 5,600 artillery pieces, 60 guided missile systems, and 620 helicopters as of 2022. Main battle tank types include: 400 M48 Patton series and its upgrades such as the M48A3K, M48A5, and M48A5K, 33 Soviet T-80U and 2 T-80UK (given by Russia to pay off debt), as well as 1,511 K1A1 and K1 tanks, which bear a 120mm smoothbore gun and are of local manufacture. The future replacement for the K1 and K1A1 MBTs has been named the K2 Black Panther (흑표;黑豹 Heukpyo), which will be fitted with a 1500hp MTU-based engine, 55-caliber 120mm main gun with autoloader. The new tank will also feature radar equipment as well as all-bearing laser detection and defense systems, anti-missile active protection, and heavy reactive armor and sensor package comparable to the American M1A2 Abrams and the German Leopard 2A6. The ROK Army is planning to field approximately 443 Black Panthers.

In addition, the Republic of Korea manufactures the K-9 howitzer which has been exported to Turkey as the T-155 howitzer as well as the ZMA series TIFV's which saw action in UN peacekeeping operations (PKO) as part of the Malaysian peacekeeping forces. A variation of the K200, the KAFVs can be retrofitted to bear a 90mm cannon, 40mm grenade turret, M230-1 Chaingun Turret, or MK-30 Chaingun Turret. A replacement for the K200 series IFVs are currently being tested, designated as the K21 KNIFV (Korea Next Generation Infantry Fighting Vehicle), which will have various capabilities for both land and naval warfare. The initial production is set for 2008, with the ROK Army planning to field approximately 600 units.

The K21 KNIFV's chassis will be constructed entirely out of fiberglass, reducing the vehicle's load and enabling it to travel at higher speeds without bulky and powerful engines. When constructed, the NIFV will be lighter than other IFVs, including the American Bradley series and Russian BMP series, increasing both speed and payload.

The ROK Army also fields the mobile K-SAM "Pegasus"(천마/天馬; Cheonma), fitted with 8 missiles that fly at maximum speeds of Mach 2.6, and the K-30 "Biho" series, which features a 30mm twin gun system for anti-aerial fire support.

Besides having vehicles and equipment of their own design as well as American models, the ROK Army also possesses inventories of Russian-built AFVs, including BMP-3 IFVs and T-80U MBTs, given by the Russian government to pay off the financial debt owed to South Korea. Other notable foreign equipment in service with the ROK Army includes the Mistral MANPADS.

In 2015, it was reported by South Korean lawmakers that more than 58,000 out of 100,549 South Korean soldiers at the Korean Demilitarized Zone lacked body armor capable of protection from North Korean firearms. The possession of only 42,030 body armor sets leaves 58,519 soldiers without body armor, and only 3,147 of the 42,030 sets are capable of protection from the AK-74, the standard assault rifle of the Korean People's Army.

A new infantry rifle, the Daewoo K11, entered service in 2010. The overall concept of this weapon is more advanced to the American OICW, however its production has been halted and weapon discontinued in 2020 due to excessive issues involving its targeting component and the quality of ammunition, to focus on fixing the issues which have been quickly resolved. Inspection of military equipment June 2021 found that 26% of components involving the Warrior Platform program for modernization of South Korean infantry is defective.

Organization

Republic of Korea Army Headquarters (대한민국 육군본부)
  Capital Defense Command 'SHIELD' (수도방위사령부 '방패부대')
 1st Air Defense Brigade 'BLACK KITE' (1방공여단,'솔개부대')
1st Security Group (1경비단)
122nd Signal Group (122정보통신단)
1113rd Engineer Group (제1113공병단)
Capital Defense Command Military Police Group (수도방위사령부 군사경찰단)
 52nd Homeland Defense Infantry Division (52향토보병사단)
 56th Homeland Defense Infantry Division (56향토보병사단)
  Special Warfare Command 'LION' (특수전사령부 '사자부대')
1st Special Forces Brigade (Airborne) 'EAGLE' (1공수특전여단 '독수리부대')
3rd Special Forces Brigade (Airborne) 'FLYING TIGER' (3공수특전여단 '비호부대')
7th Special Forces Brigade (Airborne) 'PEGASUS' (7공수특전여단 '천마부대')
9th Special Forces Brigade (Airborne) 'GHOST' (9공수특전여단 '귀성부대')
11th Special Forces Brigade (Airborne) 'GOLDEN BAT' (11공수특전여단 '황금박쥐부대')
13th Special Forces Brigade (Airborne) 'BLACK PANTHER' (13공수특전여단 '흑표부대')
  Army Aviation Operations Command 'PHOENIX' (항공작전사령부 '불사조부대')
 1st Combat Aviation Brigade 'GOLDEN EAGLE' (제1전투항공여단 '검독수리부대')
2nd Combat Aviation Brigade 'OWL' (제2전투항공여단 '올빼미부대')
Aviation Maintenance Brigade (항공정비여단)
  Army Missile Command 'ENDLESSNESS' (미사일사령부 '무극부대')
  Army Training & Doctrine Command 'CREATION' (육군교육사령부 '창조대')
 Army Personnel Command (육군인사사령부)
  Army Logistics Command 'SEVEN STARS' (육군군수사령부 '칠성대')
  Army Mobilization Force Command (육군동원전력사령부)
 60th Reserve Infantry Division (60동원보병사단)
 66th Reserve Infantry Division (66동원보병사단)
 72nd Reserve Infantry Division (72동원보병사단)
 73rd Reserve Infantry Division (73동원보병사단)
 75th Reserve Infantry Division (75동원보병사단)
  Korea Army Academy at Yeongcheon (육군3사관학교)
  Korea Military Academy (육군사관학교)

Ground Operations Command (GOC) (지상작전사령부)
 36th Homeland Defense Infantry Division 'WHITE TIGER' (36향토보병사단 '백호부대')
 1st Logistic Support Command (1군수지원사령부)
Fires Brigade (화력여단)
  Capital Corps 'DEVOTION' (수도군단 '충의부대')
Capital Artillery Brigade (수도포병여단)
1175th Engineer Group (1175공병단)
 17th Infantry Division 'LIGHTNING' (17보병사단 '번개부대')
 51st Homeland Defense Infantry Division 'TOTAL VICTORY' (51향토보병사단 '전승부대')
 55th Homeland Defense Infantry Division 'BEACON FIRE' (55향토보병사단 '봉화부대')
  I Corps 'GWANGGAETO' (1군단 '광개토부대')
 2nd Armored Brigade 'LOYALTY' (2기갑여단 '충성부대')
 30th Armored Brigade 'CERTAIN VICTORY' (30기갑여단 '필승부대')
 1st Artillery Brigade 'FLYING TIGER' (1포병여단 '비호부대')
1st Engineer Brigade (1공병여단)
 1st Infantry Division 'FORWARD' (1보병사단 '전진부대')
 9th Infantry Division 'WHITE HORSE' (9보병사단 '백마부대')
 25th Infantry Division 'WYVERN' (25보병사단 '비룡부대')
  II Corps 'DOUBLE DRAGONS' (2군단 '쌍용부대')
 3rd Armored Brigade 'LIGHTNING' (3기갑여단 '번개부대')
2nd Artillery Brigade (2포병여단)
2nd Engineer Brigade (2공병여단)
 7th Infantry Division 'SEVEN STARS' (7보병사단 '칠성부대')
 15th Infantry Division 'VICTORY' (15보병사단 '승리부대')
 27th Infantry Division 'LET'S WIN' (27보병사단 '이기자부대')
  III Corps 'MOUNTAINS' (3군단 '산악부대')
 20th Armored Brigade (20기갑여단)
3rd Artillery Brigade (3포병여단)
3rd Engineer Brigade (3공병여단)
 12th Infantry Division 'EULJI' (12보병사단 '을지부대')
 21st Infantry Division 'MT. BAEKDU' (21보병사단 '백두산부대')
  V Corps 'VICTORIOUS ADVANCE' (5군단 '승진부대')
 1st Armored Brigade 'BLITZ' (1기갑여단 '전격부대')
 5th Armored Brigade 'IRON STORM' (5기갑여단 '철풍부대')
5th Artillery Brigade 'VICTORIOUS ADVANCE' (5포병여단 '승진포병부대')
5th Engineer Brigade (5공병여단)
 3rd Infantry Division 'WHITE SKULL' (3보병사단 '백골부대')
 5th Infantry Division 'THE KEY' (5보병사단 '열쇠부대')
 6th Infantry Division 'BLUE STAR' (6보병사단 '청성부대')
 28th Infantry Division 'INVINCIBLE TYPHOON' (28보병사단 '무적태풍부대')
  VII Maneuver Corps 'VANGUARD' (7기동군단 '북진선봉부대')
7th Artillery Brigade (7포병여단)
7th Engineer Brigade (7공병여단)
 Capital Mechanized Infantry Division 'FIERCE TIGER' (수도기계화보병사단 '맹호부대')
 2nd Quick Response Division 'FURIOUS WAVE' (2신속대응사단 '노도부대')
 8th Maneuver Division 'ROLY POLY TOY' (8기동사단 '오뚜기부대')
 11th Maneuver Division 'FLOWERING KNIGHTS' (11기동사단 '화랑부대')
  VIII Corps 'DRAGON OF THE EAST SEA' (8군단 '동해충용부대')
 102nd Armored Brigade 'SUNRISE' (102기갑여단 '일출부대')
 22nd Infantry Division 'YULGOK' (22보병사단 '율곡부대')

Second Operations Command (2OC) (제2작전사령부)
 2nd Quick Response Division (Airborne) ‘ANGRY WAVES’ (2신속대응사단 ‘노도부대’)
201st Commando Brigade ‘GOLDEN EAGLE’ (201신속대응여단 ‘황금 독수리부대’)
203rd Commando Brigade ‘BRAVE TIGER’ (203신속대응여단 ‘용호부대’)
 5th Logistical Support Command ‘FIVE STARS’ (5군수지원사령부 ‘오성부대’)
 31st Local Defense Division (31지역방위사단)
 32nd Local Defense Infantry Division ‘WHITE DRAGON’ (32지역방위사단 ‘백룡부대’)
 35th Local Defense Infantry Division (35지역방위사단)
 37th Local Defense Infantry Division (37지역방위사단)
 39th Local Defense Infantry Division (39지역방위사단)
 50th Local Defense Infantry Division ’STEEL’ (50지역방위사단 ’강철부대’)
 53rd Local Defense Infantry Division (53지역방위사단)

Ranks
In officer ranks, "So" (少) equals small; "Jung" (中) equals medium; "Dae" (大) equals large. "Jun" (准) equals equivalent, used for warrant officer and 1 star generals to ensure that they are regarded as officers/generals, although these ranks are lower than the same grade with "So" rank. "Won" (元) equals principal, only used for Won-Su, General of the Army. Each of these is coupled with one of the following: "wi" (尉) equals company grade, "ryung" (領) equals field grade, and "jang" (將) equals general.

NCO rank is similar to officer. "Ha" (下) equals lower; "Jung" (中) equals medium; "Sang" (上) equals high; "Won" (元) equals principal, because this title is named after Won-Su, to ensure that this rank is higher than Sang-sa. Each of these is coupled with "Sa" (士) equals sergeant, although actual 'sergeant' rank is "Byeong-jang".

This system is due to the Hanja or Sino-Korean origin of the names.

Commissioned officer ranks

Warrant officer ranks

Other ranks

See also
 KATUSA
 Korean People's Army Ground Force

References

External links
 Republic of Korea Army 
 Republic of Korea Army

Republic of Korea Army
Military of South Korea